The 2011 ICC EAP Trophy Division 1 was played between 4–7 July 2011 in Port Moresby, Papua New Guinea. The tournament was a Twenty20 competition with the winner promoted to the 2012 ICC World Twenty20 Qualifier in the United Arab Emirates.

Squads

Group stage

Points table

Matches

Play-offs

1st Semi-Final

2nd Semi-Final

3rd-place play-off

Final

Final standings

Statistics

Highest team totals
The following table lists the six highest team scores.

Most runs
The top five highest run scorers (total runs) are included in this table.

Highest scores
This table contains the top five highest scores made by a batsman in a single innings.

Most wickets
The following table contains the five leading wicket-takers.

Best bowling figures
This table lists the top five players with the best bowling figures.

See also
World Cricket League EAP region
2012 ICC World Twenty20 Qualifier

References

External links

International cricket competitions in Papua New Guinea
2012 ICC World Twenty20
International cricket competitions in 2011
2011 in Papua New Guinean sport